Trachystolodes is a genus of longhorn beetles of the subfamily Lamiinae, containing the following species:

 Trachystolodes bimaculatus (Kriesche, 1924)
Trachystolodes huangjianbini Huang & Guo & Liu, 2020
Trachystolodes tianjialini Wang, Xie & Wang, 2021
 Trachystolodes tonkinensis Breuning, 1936

References

Lamiini